Kieran Moran (born 2 November 1996) is a Scotland international rugby league footballer who plays as a  for Midlands Hurricanes in Betfred League One.

Background
Moran was born in Kingston upon Hull, East Riding of Yorkshire, England.

Club career
He began his professional career with home town club Hull KR. During his time with 'The Robins' he played just seven times in the senior side, making a debut performance off the bench against Widnes Vikings on 4 March 2016. Moran was then loaned out to League 1 team Newcastle Thunder. Here, he made three substitute appearances, but failed to make much of an impact and swiftly returned to Hull. After this loan spell, he was sent out to the York City Knights, who at the time were in financial trouble. The prop forward had a successful spell at York as he scored his first professional try against Rochdale in the Challenge Cup. He also scored another against Keighley Cougars in a 22–20 League 1 loss and went on to play a total of 18 games over the course of that season. On 1 December 2017 Championship side Sheffield Eagles announced that Moran had become their sixth new signing ahead of their return to Sheffield. In 2018 he played for Hemel Stags on dual registration before joining Keighley part way through the 2018 season.

International career
Moran was named in both Scotland squads for the 2016 Four Nations and 2017 World Cup but failed to make an appearance. He said, regarding the latter, "The World Cup was awesome, just getting out to Australia and being involved in the World Cup was maybe a once in a lifetime opportunity."  His international debut came in the opening fixture of the 2018 Rugby League European Championship against  where has came off the interchange bench in a 36–10 defeat.

References

External links

 
 
 

1996 births
Living people
Keighley Cougars players
Hemel Stags players
Hull Kingston Rovers players
Hunslet R.L.F.C. players
Newcastle Thunder players
Rugby league players from Kingston upon Hull
Rugby league props
Scotland national rugby league team players
Sheffield Eagles players
York City Knights players